Speleophria is a genus of marine copepods in the family Speleophriidae. It contains the following species:
Speleophria bivexilla Boxshall & Iliffe, 1986
Speleophria bunderae Jaume, Boxshall & Humphreys, 2001
Speleophria campaneri Boxshall & Iliffe, 1990
Speleophria gymnesica Jaume & Boxshall, 1996
Speleophria mestrovi Krisnic, 2008
Speleophria nullarborensis Karanovic & Eberhard, 2009
Speleophria scottodicarloi Boxshall & Iliffe, 1990

References

Copepod genera
Taxonomy articles created by Polbot